Arcadia Watches is a Swiss brand of luxury watches established in 1858. In 1968 the brand ceased following a decline caused by the introduction of quartz movements. It was relaunched in 2007 by Claude Sanz, owner and President of Maison Bunter based in Geneva, and the first new Arcadia watch, the AC01, entered the market in 2010.

History 

The Arcadia brand originated in Fleurier, a small village in Val-de-Travers region of the Canton of Neuchâtel in Switzerland. Watchmaker Jules-Samuel Jequier was born in 1835 in Fleurier and joined Bovet after training as a jewel-cutter and quickly climbed up the company ladder. In 1858 he founded Arcadia and positioned it as the top-of-the-line among the five watchmaking brands of the Fleurier Watch Company, a manufacturer established in 1915. The company specialized in jewel cutting and designing watch calibres and had federated watchmaking farmers into working cooperatively. Fleurier Watch Company supplied movements for over a century to many watch brands.
 
While Arcadia had started off producing movements, this was followed several years later by a watch line. Arcadia was in fact one of the earliest brands to sell its watches around the world, including China and South America, and it was a creative, avant-garde brand  that became the flagship of the Fleurier Watch Company.

The brand sold watches until 1968, when, like so many mechanical watch companies, the advent of inexpensive quartz models led to its demise.

Rebirth 
In 2007 Claude Sanz re-launched the brand. Sanz is President and owner of jewellery watch house  Bunter SA, based in a 17th-century farmhouse just outside Geneva. Claude is a trained geologist and mineralogist, a self-taught watchmaker and a 33-year watch industry veteran.

Bunter SA, works behind the scenes for companies that customized gem-set high-complication mechanical watches for some of the watch industry’s most prestigious brands. Bunter is responsible for the invisibly set baguette diamond watches that are exhibited at every Basel Fair.
Sanz bought the Arcadia brand several years ago, and it was the enthusiasm of a few friends and his own team at Bunter that in 2007 to set the wheels of rebirth in motion. The relaunch of Arcadia has led to it restarting the Fleurier Watch Company, which is temporarily based in Geneva with all movements assembled there. 
 
All sixty of Bunter’s employees worked on the first Arcadia watch, the AC01 chronograph, at different times for a few hours per day performing varied watchmaking crafts, such as design and case-making or movement assembly. In steel and titanium, a limited edition of 275 pieces launched in January 2010 at the Geneva Time Exhibition.

Models

Further developments 

Arcadia calibers were highly innovative for their time, and the Fleurier Watch Company was considered one of the international ambassadors of Swiss watchmaking.
 
Sanz’s ultimate plan is to restart production of Arcadia movements in the town of Fleurier , with redesigned and redeveloped calibres that can replace ETA movements. 

The first watch to be made completely in-house is due in 2012, a 14 ligne manually wound movement. A ladies’ gem set jewellery timepiece is also due in 2012.

References

External links 

Luxury brands
Privately held companies of Switzerland
Watch brands
Watch manufacturing companies of Switzerland
Companies established in 1858
1858 establishments in Switzerland